Aleksey Fatyanov (born 14 June 1969) is an Azerbaijani athlete. He competed in the men's triple jump at the 1996 Summer Olympics.

References

1969 births
Living people
Athletes (track and field) at the 1996 Summer Olympics
Azerbaijani male triple jumpers
Olympic athletes of Azerbaijan
Place of birth missing (living people)
20th-century Azerbaijani people